The German Valley Historic District is a historic district located in Long Valley, Washington Township, Morris County, New Jersey. The district was added to the National Register of Historic Places on July 14, 1983 for its significance in agriculture, education, transportation, industry, and religion.

Gallery of contributing properties

See also
National Register of Historic Places listings in Morris County, New Jersey

References

External links
 
 
 

Washington Township, Morris County, New Jersey
National Register of Historic Places in Morris County, New Jersey
Historic districts on the National Register of Historic Places in New Jersey
New Jersey Register of Historic Places
Federal architecture in New Jersey
Greek Revival architecture in New Jersey